Valentina Mikhailovna Yegorova (born 16 February 1964) is a long-distance runner from Russia. She was born in Cheboksary. Her first medal in the marathon came at the 1990 European Athletics Championships, where she was the silver medallist.

Career 
Yegorova competed in the women's marathon for the Unified Team at the 1992 Summer Olympics held in Barcelona, Spain. There she won the gold medal beating the Japanese athlete Yuko Arimori into second. She won a second global title at the 1995 IAAF World Half Marathon Championships.

She returned to compete for Russia in the 1996 Summer Olympics held in Atlanta, where she won the silver medal in the women's marathon, again beating Yuko Arimori this time into third. She made her final major appearance at the 2000 Sydney Olympics, where she failed to finish the Olympic marathon.

On the road circuit, Yegorova won the 1993 and 1994 editions of the Tokyo International Women's Marathon (times of 2:26:40 and 2:30:09)  and she won the inaugural Nagano Olympic Commemorative Marathon in 1999 in 2:28:41. She placed eleventh at the 2001 Nagoya Marathon, with a finishing time of 2:28:40 hours.

International competitions

References 

1964 births
Living people
People from Cheboksary
Sportspeople from Chuvashia
Russian female long-distance runners
Russian female marathon runners
Soviet female long-distance runners
Soviet female marathon runners
Olympic female marathon runners
Olympic athletes of the Unified Team
Olympic athletes of Russia
Olympic gold medalists for the Unified Team
Olympic silver medalists for Russia
Olympic gold medalists in athletics (track and field)
Olympic silver medalists in athletics (track and field)
Athletes (track and field) at the 1992 Summer Olympics
Athletes (track and field) at the 1996 Summer Olympics
Athletes (track and field) at the 2000 Summer Olympics
Medalists at the 1992 Summer Olympics
World Athletics Championships athletes for the Soviet Union
World Athletics Half Marathon Championships winners
European Athletics Championships medalists
Japan Championships in Athletics winners